Higinio is a given name. Notable people with the name include:

Higinio Anglés (1888–1969), Spanish musicologist
Higinio Cazón (1866–1914), musician and Songwriter
Higinio Marín Escavy (born 1993), Spanish footballer
Higinio García Fernández (1956–2017), Spanish footballer
Higinio Fernández (born 1988), Spanish racing cyclist riding for Team Ecuador
Higinio Chávez García (born 1959), Mexican politician affiliated with the Party of the Democratic Revolution
José Higinio Gómez González (1932–2008), Spanish Roman Catholic bishop
Higinio Moríñigo (1897–1983), general and political figure in Paraguay
Higinio Ortúzar (1915–1982), retired Chilean footballer
Higinio Ruvalcaba (1905–1976), Mexican violinist and composer
Higinio Uriarte (1843–1909), Paraguayan politician and President from 1877 to 1878
Higinio Vélez (1947–2021), Cuban baseball manager

See also
General Higinio Morínigo, town in the Caazapá department of Paraguay
Higieniewo